This is a list of wetlands in Albania which are designated by the Ramsar Convention as sites of international importance.

List of Ramsar Sites in Albania

See also  

 Protected areas of Albania
 Geography of Albania  
 Lagoons of Albania
 Lakes of Albania

References 

 

Wetlands of Albania
 
Albania
Ramsar sites